Julio César Falcioni (born 20 July 1956 in Buenos Aires) is an Argentine football manager and former footballer who played as a goalkeeper.

Playing career

Club career
Falcioni started his career at Vélez Sársfield in the Primera division in 1976. In 1980, he moved to América de Cali in Colombia, where he won five league titles. Between 1985 and 1987, Falcioni was part of the América team that were runners up in the Copa Libertadores three seasons in a row.

In 1990, Falcioni returned to Argentina to play for Gimnasia y Esgrima, and in 1991 he had short spells with Once Caldas in Colombia and with his first club Vélez Sársfield.

International career
Falcioni made one appearance for the Argentina national football team in 1989.

Managerial career
Falcioni embarked on his managerial career in 1997 at the lower divisions of Vélez Sarsfield. He remained at the club until 2000.

He then had stints as manager of Olimpo, Banfield, Independiente, Colón de Santa Fe and Gimnasia y Esgrima de La Plata.

In 2009, he returned to Banfield and later that year led them to the Apertura 2009 championship, making them Argentine league champions for the first time in their history. On 22 December 2010, he left Banfield to become the manager of Boca Juniors. Within months he had caused controversy by leaving star player Juan Román Riquelme out of the team to face All Boys in the third round of the Clausura 2011 tournament even though the fans favourite was not suffering from any injuries.

Under his management, Boca Juniors won the Apertura 2011 of the Primera División Argentina for the first time since Apertura 2008. Undefeated and with only 4 goals against in 17 games, they were crowned champions after beating Banfield 3–0 in La Bombonera, two games before the tournament's end. At the end of the Torneo Inicial 2012, Boca decided not to renew his contract.

On 27 May 2014 Falcioni was named manager of Chilean Club Universidad Católica

Managerial statistics

Honours

Player
América de Cali
 Primera A: 1982, 1983, 1984, 1985, 1986
 Copa Libertadores: Runner-up 1985, Runner-up 1986, Runner-up 1987

Argentina
 Copa América: Third-place 1989

Manager
Banfield
 Primera División Argentina: Apertura 2009

Boca Juniors
 Primera División Argentina: Apertura 2011
 Copa Libertadores: Runner-up 2012
 Copa Argentina: 2011–12

References

External links

Managerial statistics in Argentina at Fútbol XXI  

1956 births
Living people
Argentine footballers
Argentina international footballers
1989 Copa América players
Association football goalkeepers
Club Atlético Vélez Sarsfield footballers
América de Cali footballers
Club de Gimnasia y Esgrima La Plata footballers
Once Caldas footballers
Expatriate footballers in Colombia
Argentine football managers
Club Atlético Vélez Sarsfield managers
Olimpo managers
Club Atlético Banfield managers
Club Atlético Independiente managers
Club Atlético Colón managers
Club de Gimnasia y Esgrima La Plata managers
Boca Juniors managers
All Boys managers
Club Deportivo Universidad Católica managers
Quilmes Atlético Club managers
Footballers from Buenos Aires
Argentine Primera División players
Categoría Primera A players
Argentine expatriate footballers
Expatriate football managers in Chile